Andrew W. French (December 10, 1859 – February 9, 1936) was a member of the Minnesota House of Representatives.

Biography
French was born on December 10, 1859, in Green Lake County, Wisconsin. He became a farmer. He died in 1936 in Saint Paul, Minnesota.

Political career
French was a member of the House of Representatives from 1891 to 1895 and was a Democrat. He lived in Plainview, Minnesota with his wife and family and was a farmer.

References

People from Green Lake County, Wisconsin
People from Plainview, Minnesota
Farmers from Minnesota
Democratic Party members of the Minnesota House of Representatives
1859 births
1936 deaths